Lexington High School is the high school of Lexington Community Unit School District 7 in Lexington, Illinois.  The high school usually enrolls 40 to 50 students in each of the 4 grade levels.

Academics
Some Heartland Community College classes are offered on campus for college prep students.

Extracurricular activities
Academic teams include Math Team and Scholastic Bowl.  Clubs include FFA, Key Club, student council, and National Honor Society.  The students also participate in concert and marching bands, chorus, plays and musicals, art exhibits and mock trail.

Sports
Girls' sports include volleyball, golf, swimming, basketball, track and softball.  Boys' sports are golf, football, basketball, track and baseball.    Cheerleading is co-ed.

Lexington's football team has been to the IHSA state championship 5 times: in 1980, 1990, 1994, 2001, and 2009. Long-time Lexington Football Coach (1968-1984) and Illinois High School Football Coaches Hall of Fame inductee Jim Mannaioni led the Minutemen to their first state finals game in 1980 where they lost 16-17 to Atwood-Hammond. Before Mannaioni took over, Lexington had averaged two wins each of the previous 18 years. In the 2006 season, Lexington advanced to the Final Four where they were defeated by Aledo.  They were under head coach Don Tanney, until he retired in 2006.  As of 2007, they are under head coach Mike Castleman, previously at Tremont High School in Tremont, Illinois. During the 2009 season, Lexington broke the single-season in rushing yards, rushing touchdowns, and tied the career kickoff return touchdowns by TJ Stinde.

References

External links
 Lexington School District #7 — official site, including high school information

Public high schools in Illinois
Schools in McLean County, Illinois